Brian Coates (Born - September 22, 1952 in Carman, Manitoba) is a Canadian retired professional ice hockey forward who played 202 games in the World Hockey Association for the Chicago Cougars, Indianapolis Racers, and Cincinnati Stingers.

External links

1952 births
Boston Bruins draft picks
Canadian ice hockey forwards
Cape Cod Cubs (EHL) players
Chicago Cougars players
Indianapolis Racers players
Cincinnati Stingers players
Hampton Gulls (AHL) players
Ice hockey people from Manitoba
Living people
Philadelphia Firebirds (AHL) players